William Goldman is professor and chair of microbiology and immunology at the University of North Carolina in Chapel Hill. His research relates to pathogenesis of bacterial and fungal infections of the respiratory tract such as histoplasmosis, pneumonic plague, and pertussis. He was previously at the Washington University School of Medicine.

References

External links 

https://www.researchgate.net/profile/William_Goldman4

Living people
American microbiologists
University of North Carolina at Chapel Hill faculty
Year of birth missing (living people)
Washington University School of Medicine faculty